La Clayette is a commune in the east-central French department of Saône-et-Loire.

Geography
La Clayette is situated in the southernmost part of Burgundy, north of the historical province of Beaujolais. It belongs to an area designated since 2004 as the Pays Charollais-Brionnais. As the cradle of the renowned Charolais cattle, the region is an applicant for the UNESCO's label as World Heritage Site to preserve, consolidate and transmit this resource.

Access
By road: the town is situated at the crossroads of the routes D985 and D987, 40 km (25 miles) from Roanne, 60 km (37 miles) from Mâcon, 90 km (56 miles) from Lyon and 100 km (62 miles) from Moulins.
By rail: La Clayette-Baudemont station is situated on the line from Lyon to Paray-le-Monial. Travel time to Lyon is about 80 minutes.
By plane: Saint-Yan Airport, also known as Charolais Bourgogne Sud Airport, is located about 30 kilometers (18 miles) northwest of La Clayette. The nearest international airport is Lyon–Saint Exupéry Airport.

History
 1435: Creation of the borough of La Clayette by the Chantemerle family.
 1437: Creation of the fairs.
 1450: Creation of the markets.
 1632: Alice de Chantemerle founded by will the convent of the Minimes, the building which is now the town hall.
 Until the French Revolution in 1789, La Clayette was governed from Varennes-sous-Dun.

Demography

La Clayette is the centre of a small urban unit (population about 2,800) which includes the communes Baudemont and Varennes-sous-Dun.

Places and monuments

Château de La Clayette
Dating back to the 14th century, the Château de La Clayette is partly surrounded by a small lake of 30 hectares (74 acres) and a water-filled moat. It was expanded to its current size in the 19th century and is now a listed historical monument.

Chapelle Sainte-Avoye
The construction of the Sainte-Avoye's chapel, in the flamboyant gothic style, was due to Louis de Chantemerle in the 15th century.

Église de l'Assomption de Notre-Dame
The Église de l'Assomption de Notre-Dame (English: The Assumption of Our Lady's Church) is a Catholic Church designed by the French architect Pinchard. Construction began in 1889 and was completed in 1894. Some of the stained glasses were painted by Lucien Bégule.

Gallery

Twin towns and sister cities
 Göllheim, Germany
 Marano Equo, Italy

Notable people
 Jean-Claude Delamétherie (1743–1817), mineralogist, geologist, paleontologist, first mayor of La Clayette in 1790
 Joseph Jolinon (1885–1971), writer, recipient of the Grand Prix du Roman in 1950
 André Néron (1922–1985), mathematician, recipient of the Émile Picard Medal in 1983

See also
Communes of the Saône-et-Loire department

References

Communes of Saône-et-Loire